Igor Nagayev (born February 22, 1966) is a Soviet sprint canoer who competed in the late 1980s and early 1990s. Competing in two Summer Olympics, he won two silver medals at Seoul in 1988, earning them in the K-2 500 m and K-4 1000 m events.

Nagayev also won a bronze medal in the K-1 500 m event at the 1986 ICF Canoe Sprint World Championships in Montreal.

References 

 Sports-reference.com profile

1966 births
Canoeists at the 1988 Summer Olympics
Canoeists at the 1992 Summer Olympics
Living people
Soviet male canoeists
Olympic canoeists of the Soviet Union
Olympic silver medalists for the Soviet Union
Olympic medalists in canoeing
ICF Canoe Sprint World Championships medalists in kayak
Sportspeople from Kyiv
Medalists at the 1988 Summer Olympics